Atagi or ATAGI may refer to:

Australian Technical Advisory Group on Immunisation, a body of the Australian Government which provides technical advice on immunisation to the Minister for Health

People
Atagi Fuyuyasu (1528–1564), Japanese samurai
Atagi Nobuyasu (1549–1578), Japanese samurai, son of above

Places
Novye Atagi, rural locality (a selo) in Shalinsky District of the Chechen Republic, Russia
Starye Atagi, rural locality (a selo) in Groznensky District of the Chechen Republic, Russia

Japanese-language surnames